SS Canada was a British Dominion Line passenger liner remembered as the first twin-screw steamship operating between Liverpool and Montreal. She was used as a troopship during the Boer War from 1899 to 1902 and again during World War I from 1914 to 1918.

Citations 

Ocean liners
1896 ships